The Hermannskarsee is a lake in Tyrol, Austria.

Location and access 
The Hermannskarsee is located at a height of 2,216 m in the Hermannskar, a rocky cirque, known locally as a kar, in the Hornbach chain. The kar and lake are surrounded by mountains: the Großer Krottenkopf mountain to the southwest, the Hornbachspitze to the west and the Faulewandspitzen to the north. The Marchspitze rises to the east. The lake lies entirely within Tyrol, about one kilometre southeast of its border with Bavaria. It may be reached on the Enzensperger Way, a mountain path which links the Kemptner Hut with the Hermann von Barth Hut.

Lakes of Tyrol (state)
Tarns of the Alps